The Pike–Fletcher–Terry House, also known as just the Terry Mansion and now the Community Gallery at the Terry House, is a historic house at 8th and Rock Streets in central Little Rock, Arkansas. It is a large two-story Greek Revival building, whose grounds occupy the western end of a city block bounded by Rock, 8th, and 7th Streets. Its most prominent feature is its north-facing six-column Greek temple portico. The house was built in 1840 for Albert Pike, a leading figure in Arkansas' territorial and early state history. It has also been home to John Fletcher, a prominent Little Rock businessman and American Civil War veteran, and David D. Terry, Fletcher's son-in-law and also a prominent Arkansas politician. It was then home to prominent philanthropist and political activist Adolphine Fletcher Terry. She and her sister Mary Fletcher Drennan willed the family mansion to the city, for use by the nearby Arkansas Art Center. It has been a municipal building since 1964. It served as the Arkansas Decorative Arts Center from 1985 to 2003. it is now used by the Art Center as an event space and gallery.

The house was listed on the National Register of Historic Places in 1972.

See also
National Register of Historic Places listings in Little Rock, Arkansas

References

External links
Community Gallery at the Terry House web page

Houses on the National Register of Historic Places in Arkansas
Greek Revival architecture in Arkansas
Houses completed in 1840
Houses in Little Rock, Arkansas
National Register of Historic Places in Little Rock, Arkansas
Historic district contributing properties in Arkansas